Komatigunta Rajupalem is a village in Nellore district of the Indian state of Andhra Pradesh. It is located in Sydapuram mandal.

References 

Villages in Nellore district